IME Group or International Money Express Group is a Nepalese private company. It was established in 2001 by Chandra Prasad Dhakal and Hem Raj Dhakal as remittance service. The company headquarters are in Kathmandu, Nepal.

Under IME group, IME Ltd. is the first Money Transfer company in Nepal which started its business from Malaysia to Nepal facilitating money transfer for migrants. IME Ltd. was the highest taxpayer amongst the remittance companies in Nepal for the 2018-19 Fiscal year. Co-founder Chandra Prasad Dhakal was awarded a 'Commercially Important Person' award by Prime Minister KP Sharma Oli of Nepal for being the highest tax paying company. IME Group sold its wholly owned subsidiary in Malaysia, IME (M) Sdn. BHd, Malaysia's largest MTO in 2015 to Euronet Worldwide (a NASDAQ listed Company) for an undisclosed Sum.
Biggest Bank In terms of Capital GlobalIME Bank Ltd. was also founded by Mr. Chandra Prasad Dhakal, who serves as the chairman of the board as of June 2022

IME Group owns the biggest Money Transfer Company in Nepal as well as the biggest Fintech IMEPay in Nepal. IME Group also has a Money Transfer Company in South Korea called Global Money Express Co., Ltd (GME Remittance) as a Joint Venture partnership where Hem Raj Dhakal sits on the Board of Directors. GME Remittance August 11 2021</ref> https://www.nasdaq.com/articles/top-south-korean-money-transfer-firm-joins-ripplenet-to-further-remittances-to-thailand</ref> entered into partnership with Ripple which sent XRP's prices increasing according to Subash Chandra Poudel (Director & COO of Global Money Express Co., Ltd)

References

Privately held companies of Nepal
2001 establishments in Nepal